Ahmed Galal may refer to:
 Ahmed Galal (footballer)
 Ahmed Galal (politician)